Nucras damarana is a wall lizard in the family of true lizards (Lacertidae). It is found in Namibia.

References 

Nucras
Lacertid lizards of Africa
Reptiles described in 1936
Taxa named by Hampton Wildman Parker